Royal Duc was a 104-gun ship of the line of the French Royal Navy. She was built at Brest Dockyard, designed and constructed by Laurent Hubac. Her name was altered to Reine on 24 June 1671. She took part in the two Battles of Schooneveldt on 7 and 13 June 1671 (N.S.) and the Battle of Texel on 21 August 1673, each time as flagship of Vice-Admiral Jean d'Estrées. She was condemned in April 1688, and broken up in the following month.

Sources and references 

Nomenclature des Vaisseaux du Roi-Soleil de 1661 a 1715. Alain Demerliac (Editions Omega, Nice – various dates).
The Sun King's Vessels (2015) - Jean-Claude Lemineur; English translation by François Fougerat. Editions ANCRE.  
Winfield, Rif and Roberts, Stephen (2017) French Warships in the Age of Sail 1626-1786: Design, Construction, Careers and Fates. Seaforth Publishing. . 

 Vaisseaux de Ligne Français de 1682 à 1780 1

Ships of the line of the French Navy
1660s ships